The 2017 Hong Kong Tennis Open (also known as the Prudential Hong Kong Tennis Open for sponsorship reasons) was a professional tennis tournament played on hard courts.  It was the eighth edition of the tournament, and part of the 2017 WTA Tour. It took place in Victoria Park, Hong Kong, from October 9 to 15.

Points and prize money

Point distribution

Prize money

1 Qualifiers prize money is also the Round of 32 prize money
* per team

Singles main-draw entrants

Seeds

 1 Rankings are as of October 2, 2017

Other entrants
The following players received wildcards into the singles main draw:
 Lee Ya-hsuan
 Elina Svitolina
 Elena Vesnina
 Zhang Ling

The following players received entry using a protected ranking into the main draw:
 Misa Eguchi

The following players received entry from the qualifying draw:
 Shuko Aoyama
 Jacqueline Cako
 Valentini Grammatikopoulou
 Alexa Guarachi
 Priscilla Hon
 Miyu Kato

Withdrawals
Before the tournament
  Catherine Bellis →replaced by  Chang Kai-chen
  Johanna Konta →replaced by  Zarina Diyas
  Aleksandra Krunić →replaced by  Luksika Kumkhum
  Kristina Mladenovic →replaced by  Risa Ozaki
  Kristýna Plíšková →replaced by  Nicole Gibbs
  Sloane Stephens →replaced by  Misa Eguchi
  Heather Watson →replaced by  Lizette Cabrera
  Zheng Saisai →replaced by  Kurumi Nara

During the tournament
  Elina Svitolina
  Caroline Wozniacki

Doubles main-draw entrants

Seeds

1 Rankings are as of October 2, 2017

Other entrants 
The following pairs received wildcards into the doubles main draw:
  Katherine Ip /  Zhang Ling
  Ng Kwan-yau /  Wu Ho-ching

Champions

Singles

  Anastasia Pavlyuchenkova def.  Daria Gavrilova, 5–7, 6–3, 7–6(7–3)

Doubles

  Chan Hao-ching /  Chan Yung-jan def.  Lu Jiajing /  Wang Qiang, 6–1, 6–1

References

External links
Official site

Hong Kong Open (tennis)
Hong Kong Open (tennis)
2017 in Hong Kong sport
Hong Kong Tennis Open
2017 in Chinese tennis